The 2005 MBNA RacePoints 400 was the 13th 2005 NASCAR Nextel Cup Series season and the 37th iteration of the event. The race was held on Sunday, June 5, 2005, before a crowd of 150,000 in Dover, Delaware at Dover International Speedway, a 1 mile (1.6 km) permanent oval-shaped racetrack. The race took the scheduled 400 laps to complete. At race's end, Greg Biffle of Roush Racing would take control in the late stages of the race to take home his seventh career NASCAR Nextel Cup Series win and his fourth of the season. To round out the podium, Kyle Busch of Hendrick Motorsports and Mark Martin of Roush Racing would finish second and third, respectively.

Background 
Dover International Speedway is an oval race track in Dover, Delaware, United States that has held at least two NASCAR races since it opened in 1969. In addition to NASCAR, the track also hosted USAC and the NTT IndyCar Series. The track features one layout, a 1 mile (1.6 km) concrete oval, with 24° banking in the turns and 9° banking on the straights. The speedway is owned and operated by Dover Motorsports.

The track, nicknamed "The Monster Mile", was built in 1969 by Melvin Joseph of Melvin L. Joseph Construction Company, Inc., with an asphalt surface, but was replaced with concrete in 1995. Six years later in 2001, the track's capacity moved to 135,000 seats, making the track have the largest capacity of sports venue in the mid-Atlantic. In 2002, the name changed to Dover International Speedway from Dover Downs International Speedway after Dover Downs Gaming and Entertainment split, making Dover Motorsports. From 2007 to 2009, the speedway worked on an improvement project called "The Monster Makeover", which expanded facilities at the track and beautified the track. After the 2014 season, the track's capacity was reduced to 95,500 seats.

Practice 
While there were initially three practices scheduled, with one on Friday and two on Saturday, the lone Friday practice was canceled due to constant rain. Only the two Saturday practices were run.

First practice 
The first 45-minute practice session would occur on Saturday, June 4, at 9:30 AM EST.

Second and final practice 
The second and final 45-minute practice session, sometimes referred to as Happy Hour, would occur on Saturday, June 4, at 11:10 AM EST.

Starting lineup 
Qualifying was originally scheduled to be held on Friday, June 3, at 3:10 PM EST. However, Friday's activities would be rained out and canceled. In the rule of a rain out, the field would be set by the current 2005 owner's points. As a result, Jimmie Johnson of Hendrick Motorsports won the pole.

Due to this, two drivers would fail to qualify as they didn't have enough owner's points: Kirk Shelmerdine and Mike Skinner.

Full starting lineup

Race results

References 

2005 NASCAR Nextel Cup Series
NASCAR races at Dover Motor Speedway
June 2005 sports events in the United States
2005 in sports in Delaware